The 1992 E3 Harelbeke was the 35th edition of the E3 Harelbeke cycle race and was held on 28 March 1992. The race started and finished in Harelbeke. The race was won by Johan Museeuw of the Lotto team.

General classification

References

1992 in Belgian sport
1992